Megiddo is the first EP by Norwegian black metal band Satyricon, and the first release following their 1996 studio album Nemesis Divina.

Background 

On the EP, the band commented, "Megiddo marked five years of Satyricon, and it gave us the chance to break down some barriers and do something completely different."

Track listing

Personnel 
 Satyricon

 Satyr (Sigurd Wongraven) – vocals, guitar, bass guitar, keyboards
 Frost (Kjetil-Vidar Haraldstad) – drums

 Session musicians

 Gerlioz (Geir Bratland) – synthesizer on "Night of Divine Power"
 Grothesk (Stephan Groth) – synthesizer, programming on "Orgasmatron"
 Anders Odden – guitars, bass guitar on "Orgasmatron"

References 

Satyricon (band) albums
1997 debut EPs

no:Megiddo
pt:Megiddo